Loyalty & Betrayal: The Story of the American Mob is a 1994 American documentary film. First broadcast in 1994 on FOX, the two-part mini-series charts the history of organized crime in America from Al Capone to John Gotti. Interviews are given by relatives and others, such as Bee Sedway, widow of Moe Sedway, detailing life in a crime family and what the mobsters were like. It also discusses the various illegal businesses the mobsters ran and legal ones it tried to influence, such as politics, government and entertainment.

Cast
 Billy Beattie as himself
 Mickey Featherstone as himself
 Doug Le Vien as himself
 Phil Leonetti as himself
 Jerry Maranzano as himself
 John Miller as himself
 Dominick Montiglio as himself
 Frank Ragano as himself
 Art Ruffels as himself
 Ralph Salerno as himself
 Bee Sedway as herself
 Ron Silver (narration)

Production
Produced by Bill Jersey and Janet Mercer, directed by Gary Weimberg and Bill Jersey, written by Nicholas Pileggi, Bill Couturié, and Robert Molloy. Original music by Todd Boekelheide.

See also
 List of American films of 1994

References

1994 films
1994 documentary films
American documentary films
Documentary films about organized crime in the United States
Films about the American Mafia
Films about the Irish Mob
1990s English-language films
1990s American films